Ausias Despuig  (born in Xàtiva in Spain, died 3 September 1483 in Rome) was a cardinal of the Catholic Church.

Biography
He was made cardinal on the 7 May 1473 by Pope Sixtus IV. He was then archbishop of Monreale in Sicily.
 
He became archbishop of Zaragoza in Spain in 1475, but was stripped of the post in 1478 because of his disagreements with King John II of Aragon. He was also bishop of Capaccio, a suffragan of the archbishop of Salerno, from 1476 to 1483.

References

Year of birth missing
1483 deaths
People from Xàtiva
15th-century Spanish cardinals
15th-century Roman Catholic archbishops in the Kingdom of Aragon
Archbishops of Monreale